Designated Survivor is an American political drama television series created by David Guggenheim, starring Kiefer Sutherland, airing on ABC. The series revolves around former Secretary of Housing and Urban Development Tom Kirkman (Sutherland), who is sworn in as President of the United States after a bombing kills his predecessor and everyone else in the line of succession during the State of the Union Address. The series premiered on September 21, 2016, and was renewed for a second season, which premiered on September 27, 2017. 

 In May 2018, ABC canceled the series after two seasons. On September 5, 2018, Netflix picked up the series for a third season of 10 episodes, that premiered on June 7, 2019. On July 24, 2019, Netflix canceled the series.

Series overview

Episodes

Season 1 (2016–17)

Season 2 (2017–18)

Season 3 (2019)

Ratings

References

External links 

 

Designated Survivor episodes
Episodes
Designated Survivor